The 1929 Toledo Rockets football team was an American football team that represented the Toledo University in the Northwest Ohio League (NOL) during the 1929 college football season. In their fourth season under head coach Boni Petcoff, the Rockets compiled a 4–2–1 overall record, with a 3–0–1 record and conference co-championship in the NOL.

Schedule

References

Toledo
Toledo Rockets football seasons
Northwest Ohio League football champion seasons
Toledo Rockets football